The  was a class of minelayers of the Imperial Japanese Navy (IJN), serving during and after 1929 through World War II.

Ships in class

 24 April 1929: Launched.
 10 July 1929: Completed.
 In 1936: Rebuilding by the Tomozuru Incident at Sasebo Naval Arsenal.
 In 1938: Sortie for the Second Sino-Japanese War.
 18 December 1941: Sortie for the invasion of the Lingayen Gulf.
 (after): She spent all her time on convoy escort operations in East China Sea and Java Sea.
 1 March 1945: Sunk by air raid from U.S. Navy aircraft carrier at Ishigaki Island.
 10 May 1945: Removed from Navy List.

11 October 1928: Laid down as the Capture netlayer at Ōsaka Iron Works.
 22 March 1929: Reclassified to 2nd class minelayer.
 27 April 1929: Launched.
 30 August 1929: Completed.
 30 May 1931: Reclassified to Special service ship.
 In 1936: Rebuilding by the Tomozuru Incident at Sasebo Naval Arsenal.
 In 1938: Sortie for the Second Sino-Japanese War.
 18 December 1941: Sortie for the invasion of the Lingayen Gulf.
 (after): She spent all her time on convoy escort operations in East China Sea, South China Sea and Java Sea.
 1 February 1944: Reclassified to Minelayer.
 27 April 1944: Sunk by USS Halibut at north off Naha .
 10 June 1944: Removed from Navy List.

Bibliography
Ships of the World special issue Vol.45, Escort Vessels of the Imperial Japanese Navy, (Japan), February 1996
The Maru Special, Japanese Naval Vessels No.47, Japanese naval mine warfare crafts,  (Japan), January 1981

 
1929 ships
Ships built by Osaka Iron Works